St. Paul Church is a parish of the Roman Catholic Church located at 29 Mount Auburn Street near Harvard Square in Cambridge, Massachusetts, in the Archdiocese of Boston. As well as serving as the local parish church, it is the home of St. Paul's Choir School whose students serve as the choristers in the Choir of St. Paul's, and the Harvard Catholic Center serving the academic community of Harvard University.

The church was built from 1916 to 1924 and was designed by Edward T. P. Graham in the Italian Romanesque style. It is part of the Harvard Square Historic District.

History 
The Church of St. Paul was one of many parishes in the area founded by Fr. Manasses Dougherty largely in response to the influx of Irish Catholics to the Boston area in the late 19th century. The original St. Paul Church building, a former meeting house of the Shepherd Congregational Society on the site of what is now Harvard University's Holyoke Center, was purchased by Fr. Dougherty in 1873. The cornerstone for the present church building, an Italian Romanesque monument located at Quincy Square (corner of Bow and Arrow Streets), was laid in November 1916 under the leadership of then-pastor Rev. John J. Ryan.

The architect was Edward T. P. Graham, a St. Paul parishioner, graduate of Harvard University, and winner of the first Traveling Fellowship to Rome and the École des Beaux-Arts. Graham used Verona's Basilica of San Zeno Maggiore and Torre del Commune as inspirations. The new church building, which was dedicated in October 1924, was at the same site as the St. Paul School, which had been built some years before. By the mid-1960s, enrollment had declined and the parish school was replaced by the Choir School. In 1991, under the direction of then-pastor Rev. John P. Boles (later Auxiliary Bishop of Boston), the original school building was torn down and replaced with a multi-purpose building attached to the church, which houses the rectory, parish offices, the Choir School and the Harvard Catholic Center. The present pastor of St. Paul's and Senior Catholic Chaplain to Harvard is the Reverend William T. Kelly, who has served as pastor since June 2016.

Organ 

An organ of 35 stops was built for the original church building in 1904 by Jesse Woodberry & Co (Opus 251), designed by Edward MacGoldrick.  The organ was enlarged to 50 stops and relocated to the gallery of the present building between 1923 and 1924 by Emil Mias. Mias died before the organ's completion, so his son, Paul F.C. Mias finished the organ. Casavant Frères built in 1947 a new console for the Woodberry/Mias organ, which was their Op. 1893. In 1959, Casavant annexed a Chancel organ (Op. 1893, 2560A) of 19 ranks, in the 'neo-baroque' style in the south transept to the Woodberry/Mias gallery organ. The gallery organ underwent significant tonal alterations in 1971 under the direction of Arthur Birchall, former vice-president of Aeolian-Skinner. A new “console" was completed in 1999 by Robert M. Turner, and numerous electronic "voices" were synthesized by Walker Technical Company.

In 2015 plans were finalized to return the console to its original position in the Organ gallery, and the digital voices were all removed, along with the neo-baroque pipework. An 1855 chamber organ was also erected in the South transept for use when the choir sings in that location.

Directors of Music 
 1878-1889 Louisa T. Quigley
 1890-1891 Nellie Doherty (interim)
 1891-1892 Christian Thelen (interim)
 1892-1904 Henry T. Carty
 1904-1909 Edward J. MacGoldrick (credited with founding the boys choir)
 1909-1938 George G. McConnell
 1938-1947 Joseph Ecker
 1947-1986 Theodore Marier (founder of St. Paul's Choir School with Monsignor Augustine Hickey)
 1986-2008 John G. Dunn
 2008-2009 Jennifer A. Lester
 2009-2010 John G. Dunn
 2010-2019 John Robinson (later Director of Music at Blackburn Cathedral) 
2019-present James Kennerley

Assistant Directors of Music 
 1934-1947 Theodore Marier
 1963-1966 Paul J. Hotin 
 1966-1986 John G. Dunn
 1986-1988 Sister Catherina Kim
 1988-1992 Timothy Hughes
 1992-1999 Joseph Policelli
 1999-2008 Jennifer Lester
 2008-2009 Louis Perazza
 2009-2011 Jennifer A. Lester
 2011-2016 Jonathan Wessler (later Kantor of First Lutheran Church, Boston)
 2016-2019 Jeremy Bruns (later Associate Organist and Choirmaster at the Church of the Advent)
 2019-2022 Maks Adach
 2022-present Owen Reid (Associate)

Organ Scholars 
 1960 - 1966(?) John G. Dunn
 1997(?) - 2011 James Swist
 2011-2014 Alexander Pattavina (later Director of Music of St Agnes' Church, NYC)
 2014-2018 Forrest Eimold
 2017-2018 Blake Chen, Junior Organ Scholar
 2018-2021 Blake Chen, Senior Organ Scholar
 2019-2021 Colin Lapus, Junior Organ Scholar
 2021-present Michael Thekaekara

References

External links
Church website
Choir School website
Harvard Catholic Center website

Roman Catholic churches in Cambridge, Massachusetts
Harvard Square
Irish-American culture in Massachusetts
Roman Catholic churches completed in 1924
Religious organizations established in 1873
20th-century Roman Catholic church buildings in the United States